is a Japanese badminton player. She competed in women's doubles at the 1996 Summer Olympics in Atlanta.

She is a sister of Aiko Miyamura.

References

External links

1974 births
Living people
Japanese female badminton players
Olympic badminton players of Japan
Badminton players at the 1996 Summer Olympics